Benjamin James Ettridge (born 15 April 1974) is an Australian basketball coach.

Playing career
Ettridge competed in the State Basketball League between 1993 and 2004, playing for the Cockburn Cougars (1993–1994), Willetton Tigers (1995–1996), Mandurah Magic (1997–1999; 2002–2004) and Perth Redbacks (2001).

Coaching career

National wheelchair basketball teams
Ettridge has served in a variety of men and women's coaching positions for Australia's national wheelchair basketball program. He served as the head coach of the Australian men's Under 23 team, an assistant with the women's national senior team and as head coach of the men's senior team. He became the head coach of the men's senior team in 2007 and guided them to gold at the Arafura Games. From 2007, the Rollers won 5 consecutive AOZ Championships, compiling a 45 wins and no loss record.

Paralympics
Ettridge coached the gold-medal winning Australia men's national wheelchair basketball team at the 2008 Summer Paralympics. In 2012, he was the coach of the silver-medal winning team at the Summer Paralympics.

World Cups
In 2010, the Rollers went undefeated at the World Cup in Birmingham, including a second-half 19-point comeback win against the USA in the semi-finals. In 2014, the Rollers completed a similar feat in Incheon, prevailing over the USA in the gold medal match.

National Wheelchair Basketball League
In 2004, Ettridge became the head coach of the National Wheelchair Basketball League's Perth Wheelcats. His father, Len Ettridge, served as the team's assistant coach. In his second year as head coach, he took the team to the NWBL's championship final, where they lost to the West Sydney Razorbacks. In 2006, the Wheelcats lost only one game all season before going on to win the league championship. In 2007, he guided the Wheelcats to back-to-back championships. He then coached the Wheelcats to victory at the World Champions Cup, in a tournament where they did not lose a single game. In 2008, he was again the Wheelcats coach and the team lost only one game during the regular season before winning the NWBL's championship once again. In 2009, the Wheelcats ran the table again, defeating the Sydney Wheelkings to secure theor fourth consecutive NWBL championship. In 2010, he left his coaching job with the Wheelcats to focus on the Rollers' World Cup campaign, a move that proved to be highly successful. His record during his time as a NWBL head coach was 118 wins and 11 losses.

SBL / NBL1 West
In 2011, Ettridge was appointed coach of the Wanneroo Wolves' MSBL team and went on to guide them to their first championship since 1993. Following the 2012 season, he stepped down as coach of the Wolves due to work commitments in Sydney. He returned to the Wolves for the 2015 season and guided them to another championship. After four straight grand final defeats between 2016 and 2019, Ettridge parted ways with the Wolves.

In October 2019, Ettridge was appointed head coach of the East Perth Eagles men's team. However, he parted ways with East Perth in February 2020, prior to the start of the 2020 season.

In September 2021, after two seasons as an assistant coach, Ettridge was elevated to head coach of the Kalamunda Eastern Suns for the 2022 NBL1 West season.

In 2023, Ettridge joined the Warwick Senators men's team as an assistant.

Recognition
In 2009, the Australian Paralympic Committee named him as one of their finalists for their Coach of the Year award. While coaching the Wheelcats, he was named the NWBL Coach of the Year three times. He is also a five-time Wheelchair Sports WA Coach of the Year. In November 2014, he was awarded the Australian College of Physical Education Coach of the Year at the New South Wales Institute of Sport awards.

Personal
Ettridge is the son of former Paralympian, Len Ettridge.

References

External links
High Roller - Ben Ettridge

1983 births
Living people
Australian women's basketball coaches
Australian men's basketball players
Paralympic coaches of Australia
Coaches at the 2008 Summer Paralympics
Coaches at the 2012 Summer Paralympics
Paralympic wheelchair basketball coaches
Wheelchair basketball in Australia
Australian men's basketball coaches